Montgomery is an unincorporated community located in Holmes County, Mississippi and is approximately  west of Cruger. Montgomery was incorporated in 1836 and lost that status at an unknown date.

References

Unincorporated communities in Holmes County, Mississippi
Unincorporated communities in Mississippi